Commonwealth v. York, 50 Mass. (9 Metcalf) 93 (1845), is a precedent setting American criminal case in which it was determined that although the prosecution must establish all of the elements of a crime beyond a reasonable doubt, the defendant must prove the defense of provocation, which is about the defendant's mental state. This was consistent with Blackstone's Commentaries that the prosecution must prove the defendant committed a criminal act, and the defendant must then prove "circumstances of justification, excuse and alleviation". In federal courts, but not state all courts, this changed with Davis v. United States (1895), which set precedent that there is a presumption of innocence as to having a mental state of being "legally capable of committing crime".

References

External links
 

1845 in United States case law
Massachusetts state case law
U.S. state criminal case law